Michael Philip Kendall (born 10 November 1949) is an English former first-class cricketer.

Kendall was born at Canterbury in November 1949. He later studied at Jesus College at the University of Cambridge. While studying at Cambridge, he played first-class cricket for Cambridge University Cricket Club in 1971 and 1972, making twelve appearances. Playing as a left-arm medium pace bowler in the Cambridge side, he took 23 wickets at an average of 37.04. He took one five wicket haul, with figures of 6 for 43 against Oxford University at Lord's in The University Match of 1972. As a tailend batsman, he scored 60 runs with a highest score of 13. He also played four List A one-day matches for Cambridge in the 1972 Benson & Hedges Cup, taking 2 wickets across these matches.

References

External links

1949 births
Living people
Sportspeople from Canterbury
Alumni of Jesus College, Cambridge
English cricketers
Cambridge University cricketers